White Rock Centre is an on-street bus exchange located on the border between White Rock and Surrey, British Columbia, Canada. It is the southernmost transit hub in the Metro Vancouver region and the nearest to the Canada–United States border. As part of the TransLink system, it has routes serving White Rock and South Surrey, including towards Vancouver via Bridgeport station in Richmond, as well as to Surrey City Centre, Newton, Guildford and Langley City.

Structure and location
The exchange opened on April 4, 1975, and is located at the intersection of 152 Street (Johnston Road) and 16 Avenue (North Bluff Road); it uses a curb lane and is not separated from regular traffic. Roughly half of the exchange is located on the White Rock side, while the other half lies on the Surrey side—the city limits separating the two cities run through the exchange.

Adjacent to White Rock Centre is the largest mall in the area, Semiahmoo Shopping Centre.

White Rock Centre's location is considered to be White Rock's downtown, despite the fact that half the area lies on the Surrey side of the city border.

Routes
, the following routes serve White Rock Centre exchange:

See also
List of bus routes in Metro Vancouver

References

External links

TransLink (British Columbia) bus stations
White Rock, British Columbia
Transport in Surrey, British Columbia
1975 establishments in British Columbia